The Minnesota Public Utilities Commission (PUC) is the consumer protection agency in the U.S. state of Minnesota charged with the regulation of public utilities such as electric and telephone service. Its commissioners are appointed by the governor.

External links
Minnesota PUC

Minnesota
State agencies of Minnesota